The 01207 national dialling code for Consett in the United Kingdom. The area it serves includes almost the entire former district of Derwentside. When STD codes were first introduced, Consett was assigned 0207. The current 01207 code became active as part of PhONEday on 16 April 1995. In common with all other British area codes the initial '0' is a trunk prefix that is not required when dialling Consett from abroad.

History
When STD codes were initially assigned, Consett was given the mnemonic code CO7 (corresponding to 207 on the rotary dial). With the transition to all-figure dialling which ended the practice of representing STD codes with letters in 1966, and including the trunk prefix, this became 0207.

Before STD
The exchanges were:

Changes in the 1960s and 1970s

Following the introduction of STD in 1958, most 4 digit and 3 digit exchanges were prefixed as follows; some exchanges were consolidated into others.

Consett – 4 digit numbers became 6 digits and prefixed with 50
Stanley – 4 digit numbers became 5 digits and prefixed with 3
Dipton 020,753 – 3 digit numbers became 6 digits and prefixed with 570
Burnopfield – 3 digit numbers became 5 digits and prefixed with 70
Ebchester 020 76 – 3 digit numbers became 6 digits and prefixed with 560
Lanchester – 3 digit numbers became 6 digits and prefixed with 520
Edmundbyers 020,755 – 3 digit numbers became 5 digits and prefixed with 55 – The original code for Edmundbyers was 020,755
Castleside 020,754 numbers were integrated into Consett telephone exchange and prefixed with 509: Castleside 201 became Consett 509201 (13 July 1977)
Chopwell 020,751 numbers were integrated into Ebchester telephone exchange and prefixed with 561: Chopwell 201 became Ebchester 561201 (8 November 1978)
Annfield Plain numbers were integrated into Stanley telephone exchange and prefixed with 34: Annfield Plain 201 became Stanley 34201 (18 April 1972)
Shotley Bridge numbers were integrated into Consett telephone exchange (29 September 1965)

Changes in the 1980s

In the 1980s a new wave of prefixes were introduced in the area code:

Rowlands Gill – 4 digit numbers became 6 digits and prefixed with 54
Stanley – 5 digit numbers became 6 digits and prefixed with 2
Edmundbyers – 5 digit numbers became 6 digits and prefixed with 2
Burnopfield – 5 digit numbers became 6 digits and prefixed with 2

In the 1980s, BT planned to rename all exchanges "Derwentside," but with many numbers crossing over into the Metropolitan Borough of Gateshead on Burnopfield, Rowlands Gill, and Ebchester exchanges, the idea was scrapped.

Number explosion

There has never been a number explosion in the 01207 area code, and most areas still use their original 1970s/1980s prefix except for Consett and Stanley which have introduced new numbers.

21 – DDI for NHS and Derwentside Council
23 – Stanley
25 – Edmundbyers
27 – Burnopfield
28 – Stanley (introduced mid-1980s)
29 – Stanley (introduced early 1990s)
50 – Consett
52 – Lanchester
54 – Rowlands Gill
56 – Ebchester
57 – Dipton
58 – Consett (introduced early 1990s)
59 – Consett (introduced mid-1980s)
60 – Cable and Wireless
69 – Virgin Media Cable

Short codes

Short codes, a system of abbreviated dialling scrapped in the 1990s was as follows:

4 – Rowlands Gill 02074
6 – Durham 0385
9 – Newcastle 0632
998 – Ponteland 0661

Rowlands Gill Only

8 – This was the short code to dial into other 0207 exchanges when it was a 4 digit number with area code 02074, even when Rowlands Gill was upgraded to 6 digits and area code 0207 the code remained in place until short codes were abolished nationwide.

References

1207
County Durham